Cora gigantea is a species of basidiolichen in the family Hygrophoraceae. It was formally described as a new species in 2016 by Robert Lücking  Bibiana Moncada, and Luis Fernando Coca. The specific epithet gigantea refers the large size of the thallus, and indirectly references David Leslie Hawksworth, who the authors describe as "a giant in mycology and lichenology".

References

gigantea
Lichen species
Lichens described in 2016
Lichens of Colombia
Taxa named by Robert Lücking
Basidiolichens